Tom Dakin (born 30 January 1943) is a British cross-country skier. He competed in the men's 15 kilometre event at the 1968 Winter Olympics.

References

External links
 

1943 births
Living people
British male cross-country skiers
Olympic cross-country skiers of Great Britain
Cross-country skiers at the 1968 Winter Olympics
People from Battle, East Sussex